Rachiptera is a genus of tephritid  or fruit flies in the family Tephritidae.

Species
Rachiptera baccharidis (Rondani, 1868)
Rachiptera limbata Bigot, 1859

References

Tephritinae
Tephritidae genera
Diptera of South America